2016 Asian Para Athletics Championships or IPC Athletics Asia-Oceania Championship 2016 was its first kind of continental championship held at Dubai Police Club Stadium, Dubai, UAE from March 7 to March 12.
Iran emerged as overall champions with winning 23 Gold, 10 Silver and 7 Bronze while China and India finished 2nd and 3rd respectively.

Schedule 
The championship was played as per the standard rules and regulations set by IPC, Many events are open to athletes with lower classification numbers, who are deemed to have a greater impairment, such as the men's discus F56, which can also be contested by F54 and F55 classification athletes.

Medal table

Participating nations 

 (3)
 (12)
 (20)
 (30)(Host)
 (1)
 (4)
 (20)
 (10)
 (26)
 (5)
 (22)
 (6)
 (6)
 (5)
 (3)
 (2)
 (3)
 (3)
 (8)
 (8)
 (6)
 (20)
 (2)
 (5)

References

 
Para-athletics competitions
2016 in athletics (track and field)
2016 in Emirati sport
International sports competitions hosted by the United Arab Emirates
Athletics competitions in the United Arab Emirates
Sports competitions in Dubai